Aristolochia macrocarpa, synonym Pararistolochia macrocarpa, is a species of flowering plant in the family Aristolochiaceae native to west and west-central tropical Africa.

Distribution
Aristolochia macrocarpa is native to west tropical Africa (Ghana, Ivory Coast, Liberia, Nigeria, and Sierra Leone) and to west-central tropical Africa (Cabinda Province, Cameroon, the Central African Republic, the Republic of the Congo, Equatorial Guinea, Gabon, and the Democratic Republic of the Congo).

References

External links
 
 

macrocarpa
Flora of Cabinda Province
Flora of Cameroon
Flora of the Central African Republic
Flora of the Republic of the Congo
Flora of Equatorial Guinea
Flora of Gabon
Flora of Ghana
Flora of Ivory Coast
Flora of Liberia
Flora of Nigeria
Flora of Sierra Leone
Flora of the Democratic Republic of the Congo